Calcineurin (CaN) is a calcium and calmodulin dependent serine/threonine protein phosphatase (also known as protein phosphatase 3, and calcium-dependent serine-threonine phosphatase). It activates the T cells of the immune system and can be blocked by drugs. Calcineurin activates nuclear factor of activated T cell cytoplasmic (NFATc), a transcription factor, by dephosphorylating it. The activated NFATc is then translocated into the nucleus, where it upregulates the expression of interleukin 2 (IL-2), which, in turn, stimulates the growth and differentiation of the T cell response. Calcineurin is the target of a class of drugs called calcineurin inhibitors, which include ciclosporin, voclosporin, pimecrolimus and tacrolimus.

Structure 
Calcineurin is a heterodimer of a 61-kD calmodulin-binding catalytic subunit, calcineurin A and a 19-kD Ca2+-binding regulatory subunit, calcineurin B.  There are three isozymes of the catalytic subunit, each encoded by a separate gene (PPP3CA, PPP3CB, and PPP3CC) and two isoforms of the regulatory, also encoded by separate genes (PPP3R1, PPP3R2).

Mechanism of action 

When an antigen-presenting cell interacts with a T cell receptor on T cells, there is an increase in the cytoplasmic level of calcium, which activates calcineurin by binding a regulatory subunit and activating calmodulin binding. Calcineurin induces transcription factors (NFATs) that are important in the transcription of IL-2 genes. IL-2 activates T-helper lymphocytes and induces the production of other cytokines. In this way, it governs the action of cytotoxic lymphocytes. The amount of IL-2 being produced by the T-helper cells is believed to influence the extent of the immune response significantly.

Clinical relevance

Rheumatic diseases 

Calcineurin inhibitors are prescribed for adult rheumatoid arthritis (RA) as a single drug or in combination with methotrexate. The microemulsion formulation is approved by the U.S. Food and Drug Administration for treatment of severely active RA. It is also prescribed for: psoriatic arthritis, psoriasis, acute ocular Behçet's disease, juvenile idiopathic arthritis, adult and juvenile polymyositis and dermatomyositis, adult and juvenile systemic lupus erythematosus, adult lupus membranous nephritis, systemic sclerosis, aplastic anemia, steroid-resistant nephrotic syndrome, atopic dermatitis, severe corticosteroid-dependent asthma, severe ulcerative colitis, pemphigus vulgaris, myasthenia gravis, and dry eye disease, with or without Sjögren's syndrome (administered as ophthalmic emulsion).

Schizophrenia 

Calcineurin is linked to receptors for several brain chemicals including glutamate, dopamine and GABA. An experiment with genetically-altered mice that could not produce calcineurin showed similar symptoms as in humans with schizophrenia: impairment in working memory, attention deficits, aberrant social behavior, and several other abnormalities characteristic of schizophrenia.

Diabetes 

Calcineurin along with NFAT, may improve the function of diabetics' pancreatic beta cells. Thus tacrolimus contributes to the frequent development of new diabetes following renal transplantation.

Calcineurin/NFAT signaling is required for perinatal lung maturation and function.

Organ transplantation 
Calcineurin inhibitors such as tacrolimus are used to suppress the immune system in organ allotransplant recipients to prevent rejection of the transplanted tissue.

Interactions 

Calcineurin has been shown to interact with DSCR1 and AKAP5.

References

Further reading

External links 
 

Signal transduction
EC 3.1.3